Khok Sung is a district (amphoe) in the eastern part of Sa Kaeo province, eastern Thailand.

Geography
Neighboring districts are (from the south clockwise) Aranyaprathet, Watthana Nakhon and Ta Phraya of Sa Kaeo Province, and to the east, Banteay Meanchey of Cambodia.

History
The minor district (king amphoe) was established 15 July 1996 with area split from Ta Phraya district.

On 15 May 2007, all 81 minor districts were upgraded to full districts. With its publication in the Royal Gazette on 24 August  2007, the upgrade became official.

The district was the site of the Nong Chan Refugee Camp for Khmer refugees.

Administration
The district is divided into four sub-districts (tambons), which are further subdivided into 38 villages (mubans). There are no municipal (thesaban) areas. There are four tambon administrative organizations (TAO).

References

External links
amphoe.com
A Potemkin Village in Thailand

Khok Sung